Viggo Frederiksen (21 September 1916 – 11 December 1993) was a Danish boxer who competed in the 1936 Summer Olympics.

He was born in Gørlev and died in Hillerød. He was the twin brother of Kaj Frederiksen.

In 1936 he was eliminated in the first round of the bantamweight class after losing his fight to Oscar de Larrazábal.

External links
profile

1916 births
1993 deaths
People from Kalundborg Municipality
Bantamweight boxers
Danish male boxers
Olympic boxers of Denmark
Boxers at the 1936 Summer Olympics
Twin sportspeople
Danish twins
Sportspeople from Region Zealand